Estádio Parque Esportivo Montanha dos Vinhedos is a stadium in Bento Gonçalves, Brazil. It has a capacity of 15,269 spectators.  It is the home of Clube Esportivo Bento Gonçalves of the Campeonato Brasileiro Série B.

References

Football venues in Rio Grande do Sul